Celebrity Big Brother was the celebrity season of the Big Brother. In it, the Housemates are only local celebrities. The show follows the main Big Brother rules, but with some changes. For example, the celebrity season's duration is much shorter, lasting only eight days.

The show started on 23 June 2002 and ended on 30 June 2002. The hosts were Mark Pilgrim and Gerry Rantseli. It was aired on M-Net. The winner was Bill Flynn. He won the chair from the diary room. All the money raised from voting was given for charity.

Housemates

Nominations Table

2002 South African television series debuts
2000s South African television series
2002 South African television seasons
South Africa
M-Net original programming